Roberto Yburan (born June 7, 1935 in Cebu City, Philippine Islands) is a Filipino former basketball player who competed in the 1960 Summer Olympics.

During the early 1960s, Yburan saw action for Crispa Redmanizers and YCO Painters in the MICAA.

References

External links
 

1935 births
Living people
Sportspeople from Cebu City
Basketball players from Cebu
Olympic basketball players of the Philippines
Basketball players at the 1960 Summer Olympics
Philippines men's national basketball team players
Filipino men's basketball players
1959 FIBA World Championship players
UE Red Warriors basketball players